The slaughter-free milk is a consumable milk produced from any mammal, normally cows, wherein the farmer later on does not slaughter the animal for meat production. Unlike conventional milk or even organic milk, slaughter-free milk never involves the killing of the animal, which is the typical case in the milk industry, for the production of hamburger meat or pet food.

Information
By default, in the milk industry, after the cow is not more suitable for milk production, it is killed for the production of low quality meat. Thus, the farmer receives capital gain not only by the selling of the milk, but also by the selling of the carcass. By not killing the animal, the slaughter-free milk becomes more expensive than the regular milk, since not only the farmer does not get capital gain by selling the carcass, as he must keep infrastructure and conditions for the animal's retirement.

References

External links
What Is The Best Milk For Frothing?

Milk
Vegetarian cuisine